Bishan Singh Chuphal (born 13 May 1955) is an Indian politician and member of the Bharatiya Janata Party. Chuphal is six time member of the Uttarakhand Legislative Assembly from the Didihat constituency in Pithoragarh district. Earlier, he was BJP Party Chief of Uttarakhand. Currently, he is Cabinet Minister in Uttarakhand.

References 

People from Pithoragarh district
Bharatiya Janata Party politicians from Uttarakhand
Members of the Uttarakhand Legislative Assembly
Living people
Uttarakhand MLAs 2017–2022
1955 births
Uttarakhand MLAs 2022–2027